

Private sector schools

Secondary schools

Boys schools

Girls schools
 Convent of Jesus and Mary (Karachi)
 Mama Parsi Girls Secondary School
 St Joseph's Convent School (Karachi)

Co-education schools

Girls schools

Co-education schools

Cambridge schools

Police welfare schools

Administered by Aga Khan Educational Services

Aga Khan Education Services (AKES) currently operates more than 190 schools and advanced educational programmes that provide quality preschool, primary, secondary, and higher secondary education services to students in Pakistan. The following categories of schools are considered "cooperating schools" of AKES in Karachi.

Tameer-e-Millat

NGO institutions

References

External links
  at Karachi Metropolitan Corporation 

Schools
Karachi